Benjamín Jesús Mosco Méndez (born 9 February 1985), known as Benjamín Mosco, is a former Mexican football player.

Career
He played as a defender for Correcaminos UAT in the Liga de Ascenso. He started his career with the senior side of Pumas UNAM in 2006, but never appeared in a league match for the club.

He has played for the Mexico national beach football team at the 2011 FIFA Beach Soccer World Cup finals.

References

External links
 
 
 
 

1985 births
Living people
Correcaminos UAT footballers
Footballers from Mexico City
Association football defenders
Mexican footballers